Luvsandorjiin Sandagdorj (born 25 October 1934 in Ulaanbaatar) is Mongolian professional football manager. From February 1999 to January 2000 he was coach of the Mongolia national football team.

Career 
He made his international debut for Mongolia national football team in 1958. Since 1975 until 1999 he worked as a consultant of the national football team in the Mongolian Football Federation. Also in 1989-1994 he coached the Zamchin FC. Later he coached clubs Monsol FC and Delger FC. In 1999-2000 he was head coach of the Mongolia national football team, and then worked in the MFF Grassroots Football (1999-2007).

Awards
 State Medal: 1999
 MFF Golden Crown Medal: 2009

References

Living people
1934 births
Mongolian footballers
Mongolian football managers
Mongolia national football team managers
Sportspeople from Ulaanbaatar
Association football midfielders
Mongolia international footballers